The 40th edition of the World Allround Speed Skating Championships 1979 took place on 3 and 4 February at De Uithof ice rink in The Hague, The Netherlands:

Title holder was Tatyana Averina from the Soviet Union.

Distance medalists

Classification

Source:

 * = Fell

Attribution
In Dutch

References

1970s in speed skating
1970s in women's speed skating
1979 World Allround